Grabow is a town in Mecklenburg-Vorpommern in north-eastern Germany.

Grabow may also refer to other placenames derived from grab, the Slavic word for hornbeam:

Places in Germany
Grabow (Amt) an Amt in the district of Ludwigslust, Mecklenburg-Vorpommern
Grabow (bodden), a body of water off the Baltic Sea, on the coast of Mecklenburg-Vorpommern
Grabow-Below, a municipality in Müritz district, Mecklenburg-Vorpommern
Grabow, Saxony-Anhalt

Places in Poland
Grabowa (river), a river in Pomerania, northern Poland
Grabów nad Prosną, a town in western Poland
Grabów, Łęczyca County, a village in Łódź Voivodeship (central Poland)
Grabów, Kutno County, a village in Łódź Voivodeship (central Poland)
Grabów, Sulęcin County, a village in Lubusz Voivodeship (west Poland)
Grabów, Żary County, a village in Lubusz Voivodeship (west Poland)
Grabów, Masovian Voivodeship, a village in east-central Poland
Grabów, Opole Voivodeship, a village in south-west Poland
Grabów, Silesian Voivodeship, a village in south Poland

People
Amy Grabow (born 1979), American actress
Carl Grabow (1790–1859), German entomologist
Guido Grabow (born 1959), German rower
John Grabow (born 1978), American Major League Baseball pitcher
Mathilda Grabow (1852–1940), Swedish opera singer
Paul Grabow, American slalom canoeist
Sascha Grabow (born 1968), German traveler, author, photographer, and tennis coach
Volker Grabow (born 1956), German rower
Wilhelm Grabow (1802–1874), Prussian civil servant, judge, and politician

Other
Grabow riot, a violent labour dispute that took place in Louisiana in 1912

See also
 
 Grabouw, Western Cape, South Africa